Nawab Mohammad Iftikhar Ali Khan Pataudi, sometimes I. A. K. Pataudi (16 March 1910 – 5 January 1952), was an Indian prince and cricket player.

He was the captain of the India's national cricket team during its tour of England in 1946.  His son Mansoor, known as the Nawab of Pataudi Jr., also later served as captain of the India cricket team.

He also played Test cricket for the England team in 1932 and 1934, making him one of the few cricketers to have played Test cricket for two countries and the only Test cricketer to have played for both India and England. He played in six Tests in all, three as captain of India and three for England.

Pataudi was the ruling Nawab of the princely state of Pataudi during the British Raj from 1917 until 1947.  After the state was absorbed into independent India, he was granted a privy purse, certain privileges, and the use of the title Nawab of Pataudi by the Government of India, which he retained until his death in 1952.

Personal life

Early life and family
Iftikhar Ali Khan was born at Pataudi House in Delhi, into the family of the Nawabs of Pataudi, a small non-salute princely state near Delhi, located in the present-day Indian state of Haryana. The Pataudi family traces their origin to Faiz Talab Khan, an ethnic Pashtun from the Barech tribe of Kandahar, Afghanistan, who became the first Nawab of the Pataudi State in 1804. Iftikhar Ali Khan was the elder son of Nawab Muhammad Ibrahim Ali Khan of Pataudi and his wife Shahar Bano Begum, daughter of Amiruddin Ahmad Khan, the Nawab of Loharu. Thus he was related to great Urdu poet Mirza Ghalib as well as later day Pakistan prime minister, Liaqat Ali Khan.  He became Nawab on his father's death in 1917 and was formally installed as ruler in December 1931.  His state became part of the newly independent India in 1948.  After Indian independence, he was employed in the Indian Foreign Office till the time of his death.

Education
Educated at Chiefs' College (later renamed Aitchison College), Lahore, and at Balliol College, Oxford, Iftikhar married Begum Sajida Sultan, second daughter of Hamidullah Khan, last ruling Nawab of Bhopal, in 1939. Hamidullah Khan was to have been succeeded in the titles and privileges associated with the ruling house of Bhopal by his eldest daughter Abida Sultan. She emigrated to Pakistan in the aftermath of the partition of India. His voluntary accession of his state to India by going to Delhi has been recounted in V P Menon's book The story of Integration of Indian States. V P Menon remembered him as "Great Patriot who unfortunately died young". Sajida therefore succeeded her father and was recognised by the government of India as Begum of Bhopal in 1961. Upon her demise in 1995, her son Mansoor succeeded to the estates and titles associated with the Nawabs of Bhopal.

Cricketing career
Iftikhar Ali Khan was coached at school in India by Oxford cricketer M. G. Slater and then in England by Frank Woolley.  He went to Oxford in 1927. It was two years before he won a blue; this was for a 106 and 84 that saved a match against Cambridge. In the 1931 season, he scored 1,307 runs for Oxford and finished with a batting average of 93, heading the Oxford averages. In the University Match that year, Alan Ratcliffe scored 201 for Cambridge, a new record.  Pataudi declared that he would beat it, and hit 238* on the very next day. This stood as a record for the University Match until 2005.  Pataudi qualified to play for Worcestershire in 1932 but played only three matches and scored just 65 runs in six innings. However, his slaughter of Tich Freeman with marvellous footwork during an innings of 165 for the Gentlemen at Lord's in July 1932 gained him a place on the Ashes tour for that winter.  He was selected as a Wisden Cricketer of the Year in 1932.

Selection for First Test match
He was selected for the first Test of the 1932–33 Ashes series, Pataudi followed in the footsteps of Ranjitsinhji by scoring a century (102) on his Test debut in Sydney, which England won by 10 wickets. He nonetheless incurred the ire of his captain Douglas Jardine by dissenting against Jardine's bodyline tactics. Upon Pataudi's refusal to take his place in a bodyline leg-side field, Jardine retorted, "I see His Highness is a conscientious objector." He was dropped after the second Test in Melbourne, in which he scored 15 and 5, and did not play again that series.

It is said that Jardine told him he would never play for his "adopted country" again, presumably a comment with racial implications (since Jardine himself had been born in India, and was of Scottish parentage, England was his "adopted country" also).  In fact Pataudi did play one further time for England and, towards the end of the 1932-33 tour, he said of Jardine: "I am told he has his good points. In three months I have yet to see them."

1933 was Pataudi's only full season of county cricket, and he batted marvellously, again slaughtering Freeman at Worcester and scoring two other double-hundreds. He finished with 1749 runs at an average of 49, but after more brilliant batting early in 1934 his health broke down and he played just ten games, although recording a batting average of 91.33. He played in his third and last Test for England in June 1934, against Australia at Trent Bridge, scoring 12 and 10.  Pataudi did not play at all in 1935 and 1936 and only five times altogether in 1937 and 1938. Nonetheless, in these games he batted so well that Worcestershire, weak in batting, were always regretting he could not play more often.

He has been considered as a possible captain for the India team in its first Test match in 1932, at Lord's, but withdrew his name from consideration.  He was actually appointed captain for the India tour of England in 1936, but withdrew at the last moment, ostensibly on health grounds.  He finally played for India when he captained the tour to England in 1946.  Despite averaging 46.71 on the tour, his scored only 55 runs in 5 Test innings, and his captaincy was also criticised.  He was Indian Cricketer of the Year in 1946/47.  He planned a return to play for Worcestershire for the 1952 county cricket season, but died in India before he came back.

Iftikhar Ali Khan was also a fine hockey and billiards player and an accomplished speaker. In 2007, in commemoration of the 75th anniversary of India's Test debut, the Marylebone Cricket Club commissioned a trophy in Pataudi's name, to be competed for in the Test series between India and England .

Death and legacy
In addition to their son, Iftikhar and Sajida were also the parents of three daughters. Iftikhar died at Delhi with a heart attack while playing polo on 5 January 1952, also his son Mansoor Ali Khan's eleventh birthday.  His son succeeded him as the 9th Nawab of Pataudi, and later also served as captain of the Indian cricket team. Iftikhar was also the grandfather of Bollywood actors Saif Ali Khan and Soha Ali Khan.

See also
Nawab of Pataudi
List of cricketers who have played for more than one international team

References

External links

Resume of cricketing career

Genealogy of the ruling chiefs of Pataudi
 Mihir Bose, ‘Khan, Muhammad Iftikhar Ali, nawab of Pataudi (1910–1952)’, Oxford Dictionary of National Biography, Oxford University Press, 2004; online edn, Jan 2011 accessed 22 May 2012

1910 births
1952 deaths
20th-century Indian Muslims
British Muslims
English cricketers
England Test cricketers
India Test cricket captains
Cricketers who made a century on Test debut
Indian cricketers
India Test cricketers
Indian people of Pashtun descent
Dual international cricketers
Aitchison College alumni
Oxford University cricketers
Gentlemen cricketers
Worcestershire cricketers
Wisden Cricketers of the Year
Marylebone Cricket Club cricketers
Southern Punjab cricketers
North Zone cricketers
Alumni of Balliol College, Oxford
Cricketers from Bhopal
English cricketers of 1919 to 1945